Albert Chan (born 1955) is a Hong Kong politician in the pan-Democratic camp.

Albert Chan may also refer to:
Albert Sun-Chi Chan (born 1950), president of Hong Kong Baptist University from 2010 to 2015
Albert M. Chan (born 1975), Canadian actor and director based in the United States

See also
Albert Chen, Hong Kong University professor of law